Land of the Living is the first official album by American dance, electronica and jazz singer-songwriter Kristine W. It was released in 1996.

Singles
Three singles were released from the album: "Feel What You Want" (UK No. 33 in 1994; No. 40 re-issue in 1997), "One More Try" (US No. 78, UK No. 41) and "Land of the Living" (UK No. 57).

US track listing
 "Breathe" – 3:39
 "Land of the Living" – 4:59
 "Love Song" – 4:54
 "Let Me in" – 4:36
 "Feel What You Want" – 5:29
 "Prairie Day" – 1:33
 "One More Try" – 4:27
 "Sweet Mercy Me" – 4:39
 "Don't Wanna Think" – 5:49
 "Jazzin'" – 3:55
 "One More Try (Rollo's Big Mix)" – 9:35

References

External links
Land of the Living at Discogs

1996 albums
Kristine W albums
Albums produced by Rollo Armstrong